The Alchemist's Daughter is a young adult historical fantasy, set in Elizabethan England a year before the Spanish Armada, in which Sidonie Quince attempts to save her father from the consequences of a rash night with the Queen. It was written by Eileen Kernaghan and published in 2004.

The Alchemist's Daughter was shortlisted for the Sheila A. Egoff Children's Literature Prize at the BC Book Prizes 2005, Best Canadian Speculative Novel in English at the Prix Aurora Awards 2005, the 2006 Manitoba Young Readers' Choice Award  and the Publishing In Education Award 2005 at the Saskatchewan Book Awards.

References

External links 
 
 BC Bookworld article on Eileen Kernaghan

2004 Canadian novels
Historical fantasy novels
Young adult fantasy novels
Novels by Eileen Kernaghan
2004 fantasy novels
Canadian fantasy novels
Canadian young adult novels
Novels set in England
Fiction set in the 1580s